The 1970 Currie Cup was the 32nd edition of the Currie Cup, the premier annual domestic rugby union competition in South Africa.

Winger Buddy Swartz scored two tries for Griqualand West in the final, becoming the first player in Currie Cup final history to score more than one try, while flanker Peet Smit kicked a penalty from inside his own half.

Results

Semi-final

Final

See also

 Currie Cup

References

1970
1970 in South African rugby union
1970 rugby union tournaments for clubs